The terms liberal Anglo-Catholicism, liberal Anglo-Catholic or simply Liberal Catholic, refer to people, beliefs and practices within Anglicanism that affirm liberal Christian perspectives while maintaining the traditions culturally associated with Anglo-Catholicism.

Description and history 
The social liberalism of liberal Anglo-Catholics can be seen in an association with Christian socialism. With regard to Christian socialism, Frederick Denison Maurice in 1849 said, "I seriously believe that Christianity is the only foundation of Socialism, and that a true Socialism is the necessary result of a sound Christianity." Generally, liberal Anglo-Catholics will be social justice–minded. Jonathan Daniels, a seminarian of the Episcopal Church in the United States who died during the civil rights movement, is a modern martyr for liberal Anglo-Catholics.

Liberal Anglo-Catholics allow modern knowledge and research to inform their use of reason. Science and religion, for instance, are held to be legitimate and different methodologies of revealing God's truth. This also directly affects the liberal Anglo-Catholic's reading of scripture, ecclesiastical history, and general methodology of theology. A metaphor is that theology for liberal Anglo-Catholics is a "dance" that allows people to slowly grow in an understanding of God.

In the UK the Affirming Catholicism movement is home to many liberal Anglo-Catholics. Examples of liberal Anglo-Catholics include the former Archbishops of Canterbury Rowan Williams and Michael Ramsey. Westcott House is a Church of England theological college in the tradition of liberal Anglo-Catholicism.

See also

 Society of Catholic Priests

References

Sources

 
 
 
 
 
 
 
 

Anglo-Catholicism
Liberalism and religion